Chester Ashley (June 1, 1790 – April 29, 1848) was an American politician who represented Arkansas in the U.S. Senate from 1844 until his death.

Early life
Ashley was born in Amherst, Massachusetts in 1790; while a child he moved with his parents to Hudson, New York. He was a graduate, with honors, of Williams College; following this, he attended the Litchfield Law School. Ashley moved west upon completion of his education, going first to Illinois, and thence to Missouri. In 1820 he arrived in Little Rock, Arkansas, soon becoming one of the best and most prominent lawyers in the Arkansas Territory; for a time, his partner in practice was Robert Crittenden. Together, Ashley and Crittenden founded Rose Law Firm.

Legal and political career
For some twenty years Ashley's practice was the largest in the state, and he became a wealthy man. He also owned slaves (including the father of Little Rock teacher Charlotte Andrews Stephens), speculated in land, and was the owner and operator of plantations in the southeastern portion of the state. His wealth led him to try his hand at politics; in 1844 he canvassed the state campaigning for James K. Polk for president; the Democrats were victorious, and Ashley was elected by the state legislature to fill a vacancy in the Senate.  Soon after entering, he was made the Chairman of the Senate Judiciary Committee; in 1846, he was reelected to the Senate. Two years later, he became suddenly ill in the Senate Chamber and died not long after.

Personal life
One of Ashley's descendants is Sterling R. Cockrill, the Democratic Speaker of the Arkansas House of Representatives from 1968 to 1969 and the unsuccessful Republican nominee for lieutenant governor in 1970.

Legacy
Chester Ashley is the namesake of Ashley County, Arkansas.

See also
 List of United States senators from Arkansas
 List of United States Congress members who died in office (1790–1899)

References

External links
 Brief biography, with picture from the Central Arkansas Library System
 

1790 births
1848 deaths
People from Amherst, Massachusetts
American people of English descent
Democratic Party United States senators from Arkansas
American slave owners
19th-century American politicians
Litchfield Law School alumni
Williams College alumni
Burials at Mount Holly Cemetery
United States senators who owned slaves